In Greek mythology, Tmolus ((Tmōlos) is a mythical Greek king of Lydia and father of Tantalus by Plouto, daughter of Cronus or Himantes. He is most likely the same Tmolus, the son of Ares and Theogone, who is referenced to a scholion by Euripides. However in most versions, the father of Tantalus was Zeus himself.

See also
 List of kings of Lydia

Notes

Reference 

 Gantz, Timothy, Early Greek Myth: A Guide to Literary and Artistic Sources, Johns Hopkins University Press, 1996, Two volumes:  (Vol. 1),  (Vol. 2).

 Lydia
Kings in Greek mythology